The Mahā Nikāya (literal translation: "great order") is one of the two principal monastic orders, or fraternities, of modern Thai and Cambodian Buddhism. The term is used to refer to any Theravada monks not within the Dhammayuttika Nikaya, the other principal monastic order. The Maha Nikaya is the largest order of Theravada Buddhism in Thailand and Cambodia, in Thailand taking up over 90% of the Buddhist monks in the country.

History
After the founding of the Dhammayuttika Nikāya by the then-monk Prince Mongkut in 1833, decades later all recognized monks not ordained in the Dhammayuttika order were considered to be part of the maha nikāya, the "great collection" of those outside the new Dhammayuttika fraternity.  As such, most monks in Thailand belong to the Maha Nikāya more or less by default; the order itself did not originally establish any particular practices or views that characterized those adhering to its creed. There were in reality hundreds of different Nikayas throughout the Thai areas that were lumped together as the "Maha Nikāya".

In Cambodia, a similar situation exists. The Dhammayuttika Nikāya was supposedly imported from Thailand in 1855, and those monks remaining outside the Dhammayuttika order were recognized as being members of the Maha Nikāya (Khmer: មហានិកាយ Mohanikay). A separate supreme patriarch for the Dhammayuttika Nikāya was appointed by King Norodom. The previous national supreme patriarch then became the titular head of the Cambodian Maha Nikāya.

In Thailand, a single supreme patriarch is recognized as having authority over both the Maha Nikāya and the Dhammayuttika Nikāya. In recent years some Maha Nikāya monks have campaigned for the creation of a separate Maha Nikāya patriarch, as almost all recent Thai supreme patriarchs have invariably been drawn from the royalty-supported Dhammayuttika Nikāya, despite Dhammayuttika Nikāya monks making up only six percent of the monks in Thailand.

See also
 Dhammayuttika Nikaya
 Mahanayaka
 Nikaya
 Sangharaja
 Supreme Patriarch of Cambodia
 Supreme Patriarch of Thailand

References

Buddhism in Cambodia
Schools of Buddhism founded in Thailand
Theravada Buddhist orders